The Penthouse: War in Life is a South Korean television series starring Lee Ji-ah, Kim So-yeon, Eugene, Um Ki-joon, Yoon Jong-hoon, and Park Eun-seok. The series, directed by Joo Dong-min and written by Kim Soon-ok, spins the story of a real estate and education war, a desire to be number one. It depicts the solidarity and revenge of women who turned to evilness to protect themselves and their children. It premiered on SBS TV on October 26, 2020.

At the end of the first season, the series was the 9th most viewed Korean television series, with 5.354 million viewers. The series achieved the number-one position in all-channel mini-series 21 times in a row from its first broadcast on October 26, 2020, to the last episode on January 5, 2021.

At the end of the second season, the series placed 8th among the most viewed Korean series, with 5.69 million viewers. The series achieved the number-one position in all-channel mini-series 13 times in a row from its first broadcast on February 19, 2021, to the last episode on April 2, 2021.

At the end of the third season on September 10, 2021, the series was the 18th most viewed Korean series with 3.77 million viewers.

Series overview

Synopsis

Season 1
Penthouse tells the story of wealthy families living in Hera Palace and their children at Cheong-ah Arts School.

Shim Su-ryeon (Lee Ji-ah) is an elegant, wealthy woman who has a tragic past. Her husband is Joo Dan-tae (Uhm Ki-joon), a successful businessman. She later learns that he is hiding a secret from her.

Oh Yoon-hee (Eugene) comes from a humble family background. She has had bad blood with Cheon Seo-jin (Kim So-yeon), a famous soprano whose father is the head of Cheong-ah Arts School, since high school. They get involved in a love triangle relationship with Ha Yoon-cheol (Yoon Jong-hoon).

All of them have grand ambitions and desires for their children and would do anything for them. However, their lives begin to crumble as a young mysterious girl named Min Seol-ah (Jo Soo-min) falls to her death during a party at Hera Palace. While the Hera Palace residents try to cover up the fact that she died on the premises, they cannot help but suspect each other for the murder.

Season 2
Penthouse 2 focuses on Shim Su-ryeon's secrets and the aftermath of her death, Oh Yoon-hee's revenge, Cheon Seo-jin's downfall, and the Hera Palace kids who want to be the best and win the grand award at the Cheong-ah Arts Festival.

After successfully framing Oh Yoon-hee for murder, Cheon Seo-jin and Joo Dan-tae decided to get married. Their engagement party is interrupted by Oh Yoon-hee and Ha Yoon-cheol, who have just come back from the United States. As the secrets unveil, the relationships among the people at Hera Palace are entangled, yet another mysterious figure appears and confronts them.

Season 3
Penthouse 3 focuses on the residents of Hera Palace after their trials and their kids who prepare themselves to take the college entrance examination.

Just when Shim Su-Ryeon, who faked her death in Season 1, thinks she can finally live happily, Logan Lee (Park Eun-seok) dies right before her eyes. Meanwhile, the Hera Palace residents get out of prison and attempt to get their lives back together. This starts the final lap of greed, corruption, injustice and redemption.

Cast

Character appearances

Main

 Lee Ji-ah as Shim Su-ryeon / Na Ae-kyo
 Shim Su-ryeon: A graceful, elegant woman who is kind and thoughtful, despite her immense wealth. She and her husband, Joo Dan-tae, live in the penthouse of Hera Palace, making her the queen of the building's social clique. Learning of her husband's affair with Cheon Seo-jin and his involvement in the death of her daughter Min Seol-ah, she is determined to take revenge against him. Later in the series, she is also revealed to be the biological mother of Joo Seok-kyung.

 Na Ae-kyo: Business partner and mistress to Joo Dan-tae, lover to Jung Doo-man and the biological mother of Joo Seok-hoon. She bears a striking resemblance to Shim Su-ryeon and has a butterfly tattoo on her back.

 Kim So-yeon as Cheon Seo-jin
 One of the primary antagonists of the series. She is a wealthy woman who is the epitome of extravagant arrogance and harbors warped ambitions. She would do anything for power, money, and pride. She and Oh Yoon-hee have been bitter rivals since childhood. She pushes her daughter, Ha Eun-byeol, to sing in order to beat Oh Yoon-hee's daughter, Bae Ro-na, who is more talented than her.

 Eugene as Oh Yoon-hee
 A woman whose dreams have been stunted by her lack of money and power. With gritted teeth, she took on any job and humiliation to support her daughter's ambitions of becoming an opera singer. She and Cheon Seo-jin have been bitter rivals since childhood. She does everything in her power to move up socially and financially so that her daughter, Bae Ro-na, is able to enter the prestigious Cheong-ah Arts School.

Supporting

Shim Su-ryeon/Na Ae-kyo's family
 Kim Young-dae as Joo Seok-hoon
 Joo Dan-tae and Na Ae-kyo's son; Cheon Seo-jin and Shim Su-ryeon's stepson; Ha Eun-byeol, Joo Seok-kyung and Min Seol-ah's step brother. He is a calm, self-contained, and observant piano student who protects his twin sister, Seok-kyung, from their abusive father. Because of his father's evil deeds, he slowly becomes resentful towards him as the series progresses. He falls in love with Bae Ro-na, despite Ha Eun-byeol's jealousy and his twin sister's vehement disapproval. 
 Han Ji-hyun as Joo Seok-kyung
Shim Su-ryeon's biological twin daughter; Min Seol-Ah's younger fraternal twin sister and Joo Seok-hoon's step sister. Seok-kyung was abducted by Joo Dan-tae and ended up as Seok-hoon's twin sister at birth. As a result, this caused her to believe that her own mother is the stepmother. She is a cunning, selfish, and scheming soprano student. She has been physically and emotionally abused by Joo Dan-tae; therefore, she bullied her classmates mercilessly, took her stepmother Su-ryeon for granted, and manipulated Seok-hoon for her needs. 
 Jo Soo-min as Anna Lee/Min Seol-ah
 Shim Su-ryeon's biological twin daughter; Joo Seok-kyung's older fraternal twin sister; and Joo Seok-hoon's step sister; Alex and Logan Lee's adopted sister. Seol-ah was switched out with Hye-in at birth, and abandoned as an orphan. She is intelligent, humane, compassionate, hard-working, and has the talent of a gifted soprano singer. She disguises herself as Anna Lee, a math tutor who graduated from UCLA, and tutors the Hera Palace children as she is in desperate need of money. She later enters the Cheong-ah Art School but is bullied and ostracized by her classmates including her twin sister. She dies under mysterious circumstances at the Hera Palace after attempting to expose the bullying and admission manipulation at the school. 
 Na So-ye as Joo Hye-in
 Kim Mi-sook's biological daughter; raised by Shim Su-ryeon. She was switched out with Seol-ah at birth. As she was born sickly, Joo Dan-tae tried to kill her in order to obtain her land and properties but Su-ryeon saves her and sends her to safety to America where she currently resides.

Cheon Seo-jin's family
 Um Ki-joon as Joo Dan-tae (Fake Identity)/Baek Joon-ki (Real Identity)
 One of the primary antagonists of the series. Former husband and nemesis of Shim Su-ryeon, former lover of Na Ae-kyo, current husband of Cheon Seo-jin. He is the father of Joo Seok-hoon; and the stepfather of Ha Eun-byeol, Joo Seok-kyung and Min Seol-ah. As the chairman of J King Holding who rakes in money with every investment he makes, he only cares about making more. He is a cruel, greedy, sadistic, and manipulative control freak who will not hesitate to kill anyone who gets into his way. His goal is to build a luxury building called "Joo Dan-tae Village" in the Cheon-su district. He was responsible for the events of Su-ryeon's tragic past such as murdering her previous husband, separating her twin daughters away from her- one was switched with another child eventually abandoned while another believes the mother is the stepmother.
 Choi Ye-bin as Ha Eun-byeol
Cheon Seo-jin daughter; Joo Dan-tae stepdaughter. She is constantly being pressured by her mother to sing better than Bae Ro-na. She was in love with Joo Seok-hoon, who doesn't reciprocate her feelings. At first, Eun-byeol appears to be nice - however, due to her mother's expectations and Joo Seok-kyung's influence, her personality changes drastically. Although she is cruel like her mother, she is easily tormented by manipulative people. The pressure caused by her mother led her to become psychopathic, and she is diagnosed with imposter syndrome. She develops a hatred of Bae Ro-na.
 Jung Sung-mo as Cheon Myung-soo
 Seo-jin's father. He is intent on keeping Cheong-ah Arts School's reputation intact at all costs. Due to this he tries to give the foundation to Seo-young after Seo-jin's divorce as he learned of Seo-jin's affair.
 Ha Min as Kang Ok-gyo
 Seo-jin's stepmother who fails to take care of Eun-byeol while she was in prison.
 Shin Seo-hyun as Cheon Seo-young
 Seo-jin's younger half-sister who is later caught having an affair with another man behind her husband's back, which Seo-jin uses against her.
 Ahn Tae-hwan as Seo-young's husband
 Seo-jin's brother-in-law.

Oh Yoon-hee's family
 Yoon Jong-hoon as Ha Yoon-cheol
 Former husband of Cheon Seo-jin and current husband and first love of Oh Yoon-hee. An ambitious man who believes that a man must hold wealth and power. He is the head of surgery in the VIP department of a hospital. He divorces Seo-jin at the end of season 1, and marries Yoon-hee in season 2, his first love.
 Kim Hyun-soo as Bae Ro-na
 Ha Yoon-cheol and Oh Yoon-hee's daughter. She is a gifted soprano singer who wants to do her best in school and enter Seoul National University. She was scammed by Ma Du-ki and was on the waiting list to enter Cheong-ah High School, but was cast off the waiting list after Min Seol-ah's death. Similar to Seol-ah, she deals with bullying and ostracization by her classmates and the other Hera Palace kids, but she is able to stand up for herself.
 Hwang Young-hee as Yoon-hee's mother-in-law
 She was paid by Cheon Seo-jin to make a scene at Hera Palace, accuse Yoon-hee of not letting her visit her granddaughter, Bae Ro-na, and blames Yoon-hee for the death of her son. She is a woman who would do anything for money.
 Choi Won-young as Bae Ho-cheol
 Oh Yoon-hee's first husband. It is later revealed that he cheated on Yoon-hee. He died prior to the events in the series.

Kang Ma-ri and family
 Shin Eun-kyung as Kang Ma-ri
 A woman who has recently come into wealth and leads a secretive double life. She lies and tells everyone that her husband, Yoo Jenny's father, is doing business in Dubai but in reality, he is in prison. She bribes the guards with expensive goods to let her see her husband in prison. She advises her daughter to become friends with Joo Seok-hoon, Joo Seok-kyung, Lee Min-hyeok, and Ha Eun-byeol so that she can get on the good side of the wealthy people of Hera Palace.
Jin Ji-hee as Yoo Jenny
 Kang Ma-ri and Yoo Dong-pil's daughter. She went to the same middle school as Bae Ro-na and were enemies. She accused Ron-Na of poisoning her drink which nearly caused Ro-na to be expelled from school. However, at the end of season 1, she started to warm up with Ro-na by giving her food when Ro-na was accused to be the daughter of a murderer. Later on, she started to develop a friendship with Ro-na.
 Park Ho-san as Yoo Dong-pil
 Kang Ma-ri's husband and Jenny's father. He loves his family very much and does not put any pressure on his daughter. He was previously in prison but was released at the end of season 2.

Lee Kyu-jin and family
 Bong Tae-gyu as Lee Kyu-jin
 The only son of a wealthy family of judges and lawyers, and is himself a lawyer. In season 2, he became an assemblyman in Gangnam.
 Yoon Joo-hee as Go Sang-ah
 Wife of Lee Kyu-jin and a former announcer. She is unhappy with her marriage, and is constantly bullied by her mother-in-law and sisters-in-law. 
 Lee Tae-vin as Lee Min-hyeok
 Lee Kyu-jin and Go Sang-ah's spoiled son who loves to bully his classmates for amusement due to Joo Seok-kyung's influence, and doesn't have any significant interests. 
 Seo Hye-rin as Wang Mi-ja
 Kyu-jin's mother and a former actress who has an amassed a fortune from a career in culinary television.

Others
 Park Eun-seok as Gu Ho-dong/Logan Lee/Alex Lee
Gu Ho-dong: A strict but nice P.E teacher at Cheong-ah Arts School. He does the right thing and punishes students at Cheong-ah Arts School for bullying Bae Ro-na and Min Seol-ah even though the parents and faculty were unhappy and against it. His true identity was later revealed as Logan Lee, an American billionaire of ethnic Korean descent.

Logan Lee: He is a Korean-American successful billionaire, Alex Lee's younger brother, and Min Seol-ah's older adoptive brother who grew up with a bone narrow illness and a sense of justice. He was very close with his adopted sister and was extremely upset when his parents used her as his donor. He overheard the entire incident when Seol-ah was bullied by Hera Palace kids while he was on the phone with her, and is determined to punish them. He teamed up with Su-ryeon in taking down the Hera Palace residents responsible for Seol-ah's death, Su-ryeon after understanding her pain and hardship. He is willing to risk his life to protect her from danger.

Alex Lee: He is Logan's older brother. He came to the Penthouse to find out more about Logan's alleged death and shows bitterness towards Su-ryeon. Unlike Logan, Alex is hot-tempered and shows a tough love for his brother.
 Ha Do-kwon as Ma Doo-ki
 Music teacher at Cheong-ah Arts School. He is a man who would do anything for money. In season 3, he was dismissed in all positions of Cheong-ah Arts School because of his wrongdoings.
 Lee Cheol-min as Yoon Tae-joo
 Joo Dan-tae's previous secretary, he betrayed Dan-tae and was later killed in a car accident.
 Kim Dong-kyu as Secretary Jo
 The current secretary of Joo Dan-tae.
 Kim Do-hyun as Secretary Do
 Cheon Seo-jin's personal secretary.
 Kim Jae-hong as Secretary Hong
 The secretary of Logan Lee.
 Ahn Yeon-hong as Jin Bun-hong
 She is undercover for Logan Lee working as a personal tutor and caretaker for Eun-byeol. As part of her job, she relates information to Yoon-hee and Logan. She becomes affectionate towards Ha Eun-byeol due to a traumatic past about her daughter.
 On Joo-wan as Baek Joon-ki (Fake Identity)/Joo Dan-tae (Real Identity)
 Initially named "Joon-ki", a mysterious figure who appeared at the end of Season 2, sitting beside Logan Lee during his return flight to South Korea and was last seen hastily leaving Logan's car moments before the explosion. In Season 3, it was revealed (through an extended scene with Logan inside the plane) that Baek Joon-ki's real name is Joo Dan-tae, and that the person who has long been using his identity was actually a serial killer named Baek Joon-ki (hence his "Mister Baek" moniker), who also stole his parents' fortune after killing them in Japan. He is the only person who knows Joo Dan-tae's darkest secret.
 Lee So-yeon as Kim Mi-sook 
 Joo Hye-in's biological mother who abandoned Hye-in for money and was murdered by Joo Dan-tae.
 Oh Min-ae as Ms. Byeon	
 Han Soo-ah as Song Ye-ri
 Song Duk-ho as Ye Tae-sool

Special appearances

 Byeon Woo-min as Congressman Jo Sang-heon (Ep. 1–2, 4–5)
 He attempted to kill Su-Ryeon when she found out about his fraud but was later murdered.
 Ki Tae-hwa as Su-ryeon's ex-husband (Ep. 3)
 He was Su-ryeon's previous husband prior her marriage to Joo Dan-tae, a gifted pianist who was murdered by Joo Dan-tae and gunmen. He is the biological father of Min Seol-ah and Joo Seok-kyung.
 Han Seung-soo as Orphanage Director Min Hyung-sik (Ep. 3, 5)
 Kim Byung-hyun as Joo Dan-tae's best friend pitcher (Ep. 12)
 Ki Eun-se as Journalist Kim Jung-min (Ep. 20–21)
 Kim Sa-kwon as Detective in charge of Oh Yoon-hee's investigation (Ep. 20–21)

 Jun Jin as Wedding couple (Ep. 1)
 Ryu Yi-seo as Wedding couple (Ep. 1)
 Jang Sung-kyu as Assistant to Lee Gyu-jin (Ep. 1, 5, 11, 13)
 Lee Sang-woo as Reporter Son Hyung-jin (Ep. 2, 4)
 Bada as Park Young-ran (Ep. 2)
 Ki Eun-se as Journalist Kim Jung-min (Ep. 2, 7)
 Yeon Min-ji as Alumni of Yoon-hee and Seo-jin (Ep. 3)
 Nam Bo-ra as Pianist for Bae Ro-na (Ep. 5, 7)
 Lee Si-eon as Detective (Ep. 6)
 Kim Kwang-kyu as Fake detective (Ep. 8)
 An actor hired by Dan-tae to act as a detective.
 Jo Jae-yoon as Hwang Geum-bong (Ep. 9–12)
 A real estate agent well-versed with the upcoming redevelopment of Cheonjin District.
 Kim Dong-young as Detective (Ep. 11–12)
 Kim Soo-hwan as Detective (Ep. 11–12)
 Yoo Jun-sang as Jung Doo-man (Ep. 12–13)
 A politician and boyfriend of Na Ae-kyo.
 On Joo-wan as Baek Joon-ki / Joo Dan-tae (Ep. 13)
 Choi Byung-mo as Judge (Ep. 13)
 Lee Sang-min as Prison Guard Jo (Ep. 13)
 Lee Su-ryun as Prosecutor (Ep. 13)
 

 Park Sang-myun as Bang Chi-soon (Ep. 1)
 Boss of men's prison cell.
 Jung Young-ju as Boss of women's prison cell (Ep. 1)
 Kwon Tae-won as Chief Justice Jung (Ep. 1)
 Lee Sang-min as Prison Guard Jo (Ep. 1)
 Yoo Yeon as Shim Su-ryeon's psychiatrist (Ep. 1)
 Nam Sung-jin as Joo Dan-tae's father (Ep. 3, 7)
 Sung Ji-ru as Oh Man-sik (Ep. 3, 6)
 Lee Jae-woo as Police officer (Ep. 5)
 Song Young-gyu as Kang Sin-mo (Ep. 6–7)
 Minister of Education.
 Bae Hae-sun as Yoon Kyung-eun (Ep. 6–7)
 Vice Minister of Education.
 Yoon Seok-hwa as Logan Lee's Grandmother (Ep. 7–9) 
 Shin Sung-woo as Clark Lee (Ep. 7–8)
 Lee Yu-bi as Boss of girl's juvenile hall torments Joo Seok-kyung. (Ep. 7–8)
 Kim Joo-hee as News Anchor (Ep. 7)
 Kim Se-hee as News Anchor (Ep. 10, 12)

 Yoon Joo-man as Loan Shark (Ep. 11–12)
 Lee Tae-sung as Prosecutor (Ep. 11–12, 14)
 Seo Ji-seok as Detective (Ep. 11–13)
 Shin Seung-hwan as Doctor (Ep. 12–13)
 Heo Jung-min as Doctor (Ep. 12–13)
 Lim Seul-ong as Doctor (Ep. 13)
 Tae Hang-ho as Judge (Ep. 14)
 Kim Myung-soo as Cheon Seo-jin's lawyer (Ep. 14)
 Lee Hee-jin as Massage Customer's Daughter (Ep. 14)
 Kim Do-gun as Lee Kyu-jin's secretary
 Jang Sung-kyu as Defrauded Person (Ep. 14)
 Kim Beop-rae as Restaurant Owner (Ep. 14)
 Ahn Hye-kyung as Officer Lee Nam-sook (Ep. 14)
 Choi Yoon-so as Mental Hospital Nurse (Ep. 14)
 Bewhy as Lee Byung-hoon (Ep. 14)

Production

Development
The production cost of this series is 32.7 billion won, 670 million won per episode (approximate). The series started its planning and preparation in September 2019.

The first season was extended by one episode to enable the series to end on a Tuesday.

On November 24, 2020, the series was officially renewed for a second and third season of twelve episodes each. It was also announced that the final seasons would air on the Friday–Saturday time slot compared to the first season previously aired on Monday–Tuesday time slot.

On July 22, 2021, it was announced that the third season was extended by two episode with the final episode of the series planned for September 10, 2021.

Casting
Eugene was cast in one of the lead roles, consequently returning to the small screen after a five-year hiatus. Casting for the series started in December 2019, and finalized in January 2020. Due to scheduling conflicts, Shin Sung-rok left the cast in February. Originally scheduled to take place in February 2020, the first script reading was pushed back to March due to COVID-19 pandemic. Um Ki-joon joined the cast in April.

Filming
Filming was halted on November 24, 2020, as one of the supporting actors was tested positive for COVID-19. The next day, it was reported that Um Ki-joon, Park Eun-seok and Bong Tae-gyu tested negative for COVID-19.

Release
The prelude teaser was released by Seoul Broadcasting System on September 22, 2020. The teaser was termed as "[Mood teaser] a brilliant bloody prelude". The first season premiered on October 26, 2020, on SBS TV and aired every Monday and Tuesday at 22:00 KST.

The teaser for season two was released on January 12, 2021. The second season premiered on February 19, 2021, and aired every Friday and Saturday at 22:00 KST.

The teaser for season three was released on May 27, 2021. The third season premiered on June 4, 2021, and aired every Friday at 22:00 KST.

Original soundtrack

Season 1

Season 2

Part 1

Part 2

Part 3

Season 2 and 3 Score Album

Season 3

Part 1

Part 2

Reception

Commercial performance
Season 1
According to the Good Data Corporation which measures drama popularity according to media trends, The Penthouse: War in Life topped the list with 27.82% surge in media mention in the second week of December. In the following week it led with a 35% surge in media mentions.

Season 2
In the last week of February 2021, The Penthouse: War in Life season 2 was placed first with 46.24% overall mention in media, as per Good Data Corporation.

Specials
The Penthouse broadcaster SBS TV, aired a special episode on January 12, 2021, featuring the main cast. Broadcast in talk show format, it was hosted by entertainers Shin Dong-yup and Jang Do-yeon, while MC Jae Jae talked with the six actors that played the teenage characters. Aired as Penthouse Hidden Room - Hidden Story the special recorded an average 9.3% nationwide audience share according to Nielsen for its two parts. The special also drew attention due to the trailer release for second season. The special episode for second season was aired on April 3, 2021, with the episode recording an average 8.1% nationwide audience sharing according to Nielsen for its two parts.

Audience viewership

Criticism
The Penthouse series was ranked the second worst of 2021 with 43 votes from 200 industry experts due to the ridiculous ending of Season 3 and criticized for its scattered storyline and inconsequential events, while being praised for the actors performances.

Awards and nominations

References

External links
 The Penthouse: War in Life (Season 1) at SBS 
 The Penthouse: War in Life (Season 2) at SBS 
 The Penthouse: War in Life (Season 3) at SBS 
 The Penthouse: War in Life at Chorokbaem Media 
 
 
 
 

Seoul Broadcasting System television dramas
2020 South Korean television series debuts
Korean-language television shows
South Korean suspense television series
Television series by Chorokbaem Media
Television series by Studio S
Television productions suspended due to the COVID-19 pandemic
2021 South Korean television series endings
South Korean melodrama television series
South Korean romance television series 
Television series about revenge
Television shows written by Kim Soon-ok